The Mercury Comet is an automobile that was produced by Mercury from 1960–1969 and 1971–1977 — variously as either a compact or an intermediate car. In its first two years, it was marketed as the "Comet" and from 1962 as the "Mercury Comet".

The compact Comet shared a naming convention associated with the ongoing Space Race of the early 1960s with the Mercury Meteor, which was introduced as the base-trim full-size Mercury sedan.

The Comet was initially based on the compact Ford Falcon, then on the intermediate Ford Fairlane, and finally on the compact Ford Maverick. As a Mercury, early Comets received better-grade interior trim than concurrent Falcons, and a slightly longer wheelbase.

Relationship to Edsel
The Comet was originally planned as an Edsel model. Ford announced the end of the Edsel program on November 19, 1959. However, production of 1960 Edsels continued until late November. The Comet was reassigned to the Lincoln-Mercury division to sell at Mercury-Comet dealerships, where it was marketed as a stand-alone product for 1960 and 1961 as the Comet without any Mercury divisional badging.

Developed concurrently with the Ford Falcon, early preproduction photographs of the sedan show a car remarkably close to the Comet that emerged, but with a split grille following the pattern established by Edsel models. Early Ford styling mules for the station wagon model carried the Edsel name, as well.

At their debut, the split grille was replaced by one more in keeping with Mercury's design themes, but the canted elliptical taillights, first seen on the Edsel prototype, were used and carried the "E" (Edsel) part number on them. While the short-lived 1960 Edsels used elliptical-shaped taillights, the lenses used on both cars differed in length and width. Certain other parts from the 1959 Edsel parts bin, including the parking lights and dashboard knobs, were used on the first-year Comet. Keys for the 1960 and 1961 Comets were shaped like Edsel keys, with the center bar of the "E" removed to form a "C".

The "Comet" name was trademarked to Cotner-Bevington as the Comet Coach Company, building ambulance and hearse commercial vehicles. Ford bought the name in 1959.

Overview
From 1960–1965, the Comet was based on the Ford Falcon platform (stretched  for sedans, but not for wagons). The 1960–1963 Comets share a similar basic shape. These are sometimes referred to as the "round body" Comets. For 1962 and 1963, the Comet shared a considerable number of body and mechanical parts with the short-lived Fairlane-based Mercury Meteor intermediate.

First generation (1960–1963)

The Comet was initially released without any divisional badging, only "Comet" badges, similar to Valiant, which did not have Plymouth badging at first. It was sold through Lincoln-Mercury-Comet dealers, but was not branded as a Mercury Comet for two more years. This was similar to Ford's treatment of the Meteor and Frontenac of Canada, sold through Meteor-Mercury-Frontenac dealers.

Introduced in March 1960, initial body styles were two- and four-door sedans and two- and four-door station wagons. Two trim levels were available, standard and "Custom", with the latter including badging, additional chrome trim, and all-vinyl interiors. In 1960, the only engine available was the 144 cid Thriftpower straight-six with a single-barrel Holley carburetor, which produced  at 4200 rpm. (Some sources list it as producing  at 4200 rpm.) Transmission options were a column-shifted three-speed manual and a two-speed Merc-O-Matic automatic transmission (unique to the Comet, despite sharing a name with the Merc-O-Matic installed in other Mercurys).

Ford had purchased the name "Comet" from Comet Coach Company, a professional car manufacturer in which the term belonged to a line of funeral coaches, mainly Oldsmobiles. The coach company then was renamed Cotner-Bevington.

In Canada, for the 1960 model year, Meteor-Mercury dealers sold a compact car called the "Frontenac". Considered a marque in its own right, it was a badge-engineered version of the Ford Falcon with only minor trim differences to distinguish it from the Falcon. The Frontenac was produced for only one year. The Comet was introduced to the Canadian market for the 1961 model year and replaced the Frontenac as the compact offering by Meteor-Mercury dealers.

In response to complaints about the low performance of the 144 cid engine, a 170 cid Thriftpower with a single-barrel Holley carburetor producing  at 4400 rpm was released for the 1961 model year. A new four-speed manual transmission was also an option (a Dagenham without first-gear synchromesh). The changes to the 1961 Comet were minimal, such as moving the Comet script from the front fender to the rear quarter and a new grille design. 

The optional S-22 package was released. Available only on the two-door sedan, it was billed as a "sport" package, although it shared the same mechanicals as regular Comets, with the only changes being S-22 badging, bucket seats, and a center console.

Comet was officially made a Mercury model for the 1962 model year, and it received some minor restyling, mainly a redesign of the trunk and taillight area to bring the car more in line with the Mercury look. This is the first year the car carried Mercury badging.
The S-22 had six bullet-shaped taillights, while regular Comets had four oval with two optional flat reverse lights. A Comet Villager station wagon, basically a Comet Custom four-door station wagon with simulated woodgrain side panels, was added to the lineup. (The Villager name had previously been used to denote the four-door, steel-sided station wagon in the Edsel Ranger series.)

While the 1963 model looked almost identical to the earlier models, the chassis and suspension were redesigned to accommodate an optional 260 cid V8 engine (borrowed from the Fairlane) using a two-barrel carburetor and producing . Convertible and hardtop (pillar-less) coupe models were added to the Comet Custom and Comet S-22 lines this year.

The front ends of these Comets differed from their Falcon counterparts in that they had four headlights instead of two; similar situations resurfaced in the late 1970s, with the Ford Thunderbird/Mercury Cougar and the Ford Fairmont/Mercury Zephyr.

Second generation (1964–1965)

The 1964 Comet was redesigned with a much more square shape, though it was still built on the same unibody as the 1963 model. Its basic lines were shared with the new Falcon, but the front grille used styling similar to that of the Lincoln Continental. Along with the redesign, the model designations were changed. The performance version was known as the Cyclone, replacing the previous S-22. Then in descending order of trim levels were the Caliente, 404, and 202, replacing the previous Custom and base models. The two-door station wagon bodystyle was discontinued. The top-of-the-line station wagon continued to be known as the Villager. The 144 inline-six engine was dropped, leaving the 170 as the base engine. The 260 V8 was available at the beginning of the production run, with the new 289 being available mid-year. Due to the success of the full-sized Ford and Mercury "fastback" roofline introduced in mid-1963, the Falcon and Comet two-door hardtops got a similar roofline with sharper corners.

For 1964, Ford produced about 50 ultra-high performance, lightweight Comet Cyclones, equipped with their racing two-carburetor 427 engine, similar to the related Ford Thunderbolt. To avoid competing with each other, the Thunderbolts ran in Super Stock on  tires, but the Cyclones were modified to run in A/FX on  tires, where they were as dominant as the Thunderbolts were in Super Stock.  Drivers included Ronnie Sox, Don Nicholson, and Wild Bill Shrewsberry in conjunction with Jack Chrisman. Shrewsberry still owns his original 427 Comet in Caliente trim.

For 1965, the Comet received updated styling front and rear (including stacked headlights, similar to what full-sized Fords, Pontiacs, and Cadillacs would use at the same time). The standard transmission continued as a column-shifted, three-speed manual transmission. The optional automatic was changed to a "Merc-O-Matic" three-speed automatic transmission (essentially a Ford C4). The 289 V8 was available in three horsepower ratings: base two-barrel 200 hp, four-barrel , and the high-performance  version from the Ford Mustang, paired with a four-speed manual transmission.

Third generation (1966–1967)

Beginning in 1966, the Comet grew from a compact to become a mid-sized car. It was now based on the same chassis as the Ford Fairlane intermediate (and the previous Mercury Meteor intermediate, which was only offered in 1962–1963). These intermediate-sized cars used the same basic chassis as the original Ford Falcon and Mercury Comet compacts, but were stretched with longer wheelbases. The previous-generation Comet shared its platform with the all-new Ford Mustang in 1964, and when the Comet graduated to the intermediate platform, the Mercury Cougar became the platform shared with the Mustang.

The Comet wagon introduced a Dual-Action tailgate, able to both fold down or swing aside, an idea soon copied by all the major U.S. manufacturers.

The 1966 Comet received distinct outer body panels. The Comet Capri replaced the previous Comet 404 and the Comet Voyager four-door station wagon replaced the previous Comet 404 station wagon. The Voyager name had previously been used to designate a full-sized Mercury station wagon that was positioned between the base Commuter and the top-of-the-line Colony Park station wagon models. The Comet 202 four-door station wagon was discontinued. The new top-of-the-line series was the Comet Cyclone GT.

New engines available in the Comet for 1966 included a 390 cid V8 engine with a two-barrel carburetor producing  at 4400 rpm, a 390 cid V8 engine with a four-barrel carburetor producing , and 390 cid V8 engine that produced . The 335 hp 390 cid V8 engine was standard on the Cyclone GT and optional on other models. The Cyclone GT when equipped with an automatic transmission was referred to as the Cyclone GTA.

A Cyclone GT convertible was the pace car for the 1966 Indianapolis 500.

Beginning with the 1967 model year, the Comet name was used only on the base Comet 202 model, available only in two- or four-door sedan body styles. Other models were now referred to by what had previously been their subseries names. Mercury's mid-sized line-up ranged from the basic Comet 202, through the Capri, Caliente, Cyclone, and Cyclone GT models, as well as steel-sided Voyager and simulated wood-paneled Villager station wagon models, which were comparable to the Capri.

Fourth generation (1968–1969)

In 1968, Mercury's mid-sized models again received new sheet metal and styling that resembled the full-sized Mercury models and shared their chassis and many parts with Ford's mid-sized Fairlane and Torino models. The mid-sized base model was the Comet (Mercury dropped the 202 suffix) available only as a two-door coupe. The Capri was replaced by the Montego, and the Caliente by the Montego MX. Also, the more luxurious Montego MX Brougham was basically an option package for the Montego MX. Top-of-the-line, mid-sized models continued to use the Cyclone and Cyclone GT names.

A 302 cid V8 engine using a two-barrel carburetor and generating  at 4600 rpm would replace the previous 289 cid V8 midway in the 1968 model year. For the 1969 model year, the grille was modified and the headlight surrounds were removed.  The taillights were also slightly restyled. Few changes to Mercury's mid-sized lineup were made for the 1969 model year, the last year that the Comet name graced a mid-sized model. A Comet four-door sedan for 1969 was supposedly planned, but never offered. New top-of-the-line Cyclone Spoiler and Cyclone CJ models joined the lineup.

A 250 cid inline-six using a single-barrel carburetor and generating  at 4000 rpm  replaced the previous 200 cid 6 as standard. New engine options included a 302 cid V-8 engine using a four-barrel carburetor and generating  at 4400 rpm (standard on the Cyclone), a 351 cid V-8 using a four-barrel carburetor generating  at 5200 rpm (standard on the Cyclone Spoiler), and a 428 cid V-8 using a four-barrel carburetor generating  at 5200 rpm (standard on the Cyclone CJ). These new V-8s replaced the previous 390 cid V-8s.

After 1969, the use of the Comet name was suspended as the base model for Mercury's intermediate model line became the Montego. The Cyclone name continued to be used through the 1971 model year.

Fifth generation (1971–1977)

For 1971, the Comet name was revived on Mercury's version of the Ford Maverick compact. Sharing most of its sheet metal with the Maverick, it used a different grille, taillights, and hood, as well as different badging. The taillight pods were shared with the 1970 and 1971 Montego and Cyclone models. Underneath it all was the same basic chassis that had originally been used for the Ford Falcon, the original Comet, and for the mid-sized Ford Fairlane, Mercury Meteor, and later Mercury Comets.

The base engine was the 170 cid inline-six with a single-barrel carburetor producing  at 4200 rpm. Optional engines were the 200 cid inline-six with a single-barrel carburetor producing  and a 302 cid V8 with a two-barrel carburetor producing . Transmissions were either a three-speed manual or three-speed automatic with either column or floor-mounted shifters.

The Comet was available as two- and four-door sedans and in base (1971–1977), and "muscle car" Comet GT series (two-door sedan-only 1971-1975). The GT featured a blacked-out grille, dual body-side tape stripes, high-back bucket seats, wheel trim rings, dual racing mirrors, bright window frames, black instrument panel, deluxe door trim panels, and a simulated hood scoop.

For 1973 models, the base 170 cid six was dropped and the 200 cid six became the base engine. Horsepower ratings would fluctuate slightly up or down through the years the Comet would remain in production, but not by very much. A new, larger front bumper to meet federal standards was added to all models in 1973. A new Custom decor package featuring vinyl roof, body-colored wheel covers, wide vinyl-insert body-side moldings, vinyl bucket seats, luxury carpeting, and extra sound insulation was a popular option.

Changes for 1974 included even larger front bumpers and new larger rear bumpers to match due to new federal mandates for safety.

Ford had originally planned to the replace the Comet and its Ford Maverick counterpart for the 1975 model year with updated and extensively redesigned models that would continue to use the Comet and Maverick names. Fairly late, though, they decided that the updated versions would be built alongside the original Maverick and the Comet that had originally been introduced for 1971. These would-be replacements, also using the same basic chassis as the Comet and Maverick, became the Mercury Monarch and the American Ford Granada; these came with more standard and optional equipment than the Comet and Maverick, and were considered to be "luxury compacts", a step up from the Comet and Maverick.

Although 1975 was the last year for the Mercury Comet GT, the GT features remained available in 1976 and 1977 with the "Sports Accent" option group.

The model was offered with comparatively few changes through the 1977 model year, and was then discontinued to make room for the new Mercury Zephyr for the 1978 model year.

High mileage record
In July 2010, USA Today reported on a 91-year-old Florida woman, Rachel Veitch, who was still driving her 1964 Comet Caliente daily. The car was purchased new, and Veitch set a record by accumulating over 562,000 documented miles. The car was retired in 2012 after accumulating 576,000 miles, as Veitch had decided to stop driving due to her eyesight becoming too weak.

Mercury Cyclone

The Cyclone was a performance model of the Comet. It was built from 1964–1971.

1968–1969 Mercury Cyclone
The Cyclone received Mercury’s biggest facelift in 1968, switching from 1967's boxy, Fairlane-derived coupe body to the super-streamlined Torino-based fastback. Unfortunately, the Cyclone GT lost the 335-hp, 390 cid V8 as its standard engine, instead replaced by the 210 hp, 302 cid V8. No matter, though, as the fastback was handsome and could be equipped with a 230 hp 302, 265  or 325 hp 390 cid V8s, or a 335 hp, 428 cid V8.

By 1969, the Mercury Cyclone formal hardtop had been cancelled and the GT fastback was also available as a CJ model. That came with the 335 hp, 428 cid V8 standard, a four-speed transmission, and a plain bench seat interior. At $3,207, the CJ was aimed at the Plymouth Road Runner, and a 335 hp version could run 0-60 in 6.1 seconds with a quarter-mile time of 13.9 seconds. The Mercury Cyclone Spoiler and the Ford Torino Talladega launched the NASCAR streamliner battle when Cale Yarborough won the Daytona 500 in 1968 in a Woods Brothers Cyclone. Dodge produced the Daytona 500 and Ford retaliated with the Torino Talladega and Mercury Spoiler. Both were to have streamlined noses, but the Mercury launch was delayed until the mid-year Cyclone Spoiler II. Only 519 were sold, all with 351 cid V8s instead of the bigger 428. A Dan Gurney special edition had a dark blue roof, striping, and a signature decal on the white lowers, while the Cale Yarborough edition was red and white like his Woods Brothers car, with a signature.

1970 Mercury Cyclone
Three Cyclone models were produced for 1970, all of which shared the Torino’s semifastback body, and all of which carried a four-part nose. The base car had a 360 hp, 429 cid V8 and a four-speed transmission. Options included a 370 hp, 429 cid V8 engine and a 375 hp, Super CJ 429 cid engine. A few Boss 429s installed were also installed, though those cars are quite rare today. Meanwhile, the Cyclone GT was detuned to a 250 hp, 351 cid V8 and the Spoiler packed a Ram Air 370 hp, 429.

1971 Mercury Cyclone
The 1971 model year was the Cyclone’s last, as the muscle car wars wound down. With few changes from 1970, the Cyclone was absorbed into the Mercury Montego line, and only 444 Montego Cyclones were sold, along with 2,287 Cyclone GTs and 353 Cyclone Spoilers. Engine options ranged from the 210 hp, 302 cid V8, all the way to the fire-breathing 370 hp, 429 cid Cobra Jet V8, to which a Ram Air package could be added.

Mercury Cyclones occupy a niche in the muscle car world, along with Oldsmobile W-30s and Buick GSX Stage Is. The car is a fantastic expression of American muscle, albeit one from a mid-level, luxury-oriented nameplate. As a result, the Cyclone is mostly overshadowed by the Ford Mustang and Torino. The Cyclone’s sleeper status makes it a great value, and most cars remain within reach of any buyer. As with any muscle car of the era, the importance of documentation in terms of market price rises exponentially as the car’s horsepower ratings climb.

Sources
Burness, Tad, American Car Spotter's Guide (Osceola, WI: Motorbooks International, 1978 & 1981)
Flammang, James M. & Kowlake, Ron, Standard Catalog of American Cars: 1976-199, 3rd Edition (Iola, WI: Krause Publications, 1999)
Gunnell, John, Standard Catalog of American Cars: 1946-1975, Revised 4th Edition (Iola, WI: Krause Publications, 2002)

References

External links

MuscleCar Club Comet page
1960-69 Mercury Comet Information
Comet Discussion Group
The Central North American Comet Club and Comet Performance Forum
Maverick-Comet Club

Comet
Comet
Rear-wheel-drive vehicles
Compact cars
Convertibles
Mid-size cars
Coupés
Muscle cars
Sedans
Station wagons
1960s cars
1970s cars